Bank of America Plaza is a , 23-story office building located at Las Olas City Centre in downtown Fort Lauderdale, Florida. The structure was finished in early 2003, and contains a parking garage which is located on the second to sixth floors, a small retail mall, and a Bank of America—the building's namesake tenant—on the ground floor. It is currently the fifth tallest building in Ft. Lauderdale.

The rest of the building, however, is strictly off-limits to the public, with the exception of employees and company clients. These individuals must maintain an ID card in order to access the building's elevators.

The tower's pyramidal top, which resembles the Miami-Dade County Courthouse's, rises 42 ft, and is the signature portion of the building. It is illuminated at night, which gives it a prominent place in the city's skyline.

See also
List of tallest buildings in Fort Lauderdale

References

External links

Bank of America buildings
Skyscrapers in Fort Lauderdale, Florida
Skyscraper office buildings in Florida
Office buildings completed in 2003
2003 establishments in Florida